Admoni is a Jewish surname, which means "red" or "ruddy" in Hebrew. Notable people with the surname include:

 Johann Admoni (1906–1979), Russian composer
 Nahum Admoni (born 1929), Israeli intelligence officer
 Vladimir Admoni (1909–1993), Russian writer and translator

References 

Jewish surnames